This is a list of progressive house artists.  This list does not include little-known local artists or big room house DJ and producers. See big room house for notable DJs and producers such as Hardwell, Martin Garrix, and Swedish House Mafia.

A

Adam K & Soha
Afrojack 
Alesso 
Steve Angello 
Arty (also released as Alpha 9)
Arno Cost
ATB
Audien
Avicii
Axwell

B

Robert Babicz
Bassjackers 
Bellatrax
Benny Benassi 
Randy Bettis
Blasterjaxx 
Boom Jinx
Gui Boratto
Brainbug
Michael Brun

C
Michael Calfan
Mike Candys
Cash Cash
Hernán Cattáneo
The Chainsmokers
Chicane

D

Dada Life
Daddy's Groove
John Dahlbäck
Dannic
Matt Darey
Dash Berlin
John de Sohn
Deadmau5
Deep Dish
Deepsky
Mike Dierickx
John Digweed
Dinka
Dirty South
Dosem
Drum Club
Dubfire
DubVision
Dyro
Dzeko
Dzeko & Torres

E
EDX
Darren Emerson
Darin Epsilon

F
Faithless
Nathan Fake
Matt Fax
Feenixpawl
Firebeatz
First State
Fluke
Seb Fontaine
Fonzerelli

G
Gabriel & Dresden
Martin Garrix 
Gat Decor
Guy Gerber
Max Graham
Groove Armada
Grum
David Guetta

H
Hard Rock Sofa
Hardwell 
Maestro Harrell
Calvin Harris
Headhunterz
James Holden
Hot Since 82
Danny Howells
Hybrid

I
Sebastian Ingrosso

J
Guy J
Jaytech
Jason Jollins

K
Kaskade
Khen
Kingkade
Eelke Kleijn
Sander Kleinenberg
Deniz Koyu
Krewella 
KSHMR
Kyotto

L
Lane 8
Steve Lawler
Fedde le Grand
Leftfield
Lucas & Steve

M
Manse
Guy Mantzur
Marshmello
Matisse & Sadko
Joe Maz
Michael Mind Project
Minilogue
Mixmaster Morris
Moby
Paolo Mojo
Moonbeam
Erick Morillo
Moti

O
Mario Ochoa
Jeremy Olander
Opus III
William Orbit
Orbital
Otto Knows
Ummet Ozcan

P

Morgan Page
Anthony Pappa
Paris & Simo
Florian Picasso
Pole Folder
Steve Porter
The Presets
Project 46 
Eric Prydz (also released as Pryda)

Q
Quivver

R
Porter Robinson
Nicky Romero
Roy Rosenfeld
Ryos

S

Roger Sanchez
Sash!
Sasha
Shapov
Sick Individuals
Spooky
Stadiumx
Sunscreem
Swanky Tunes
Tom Swoon
System 7

T
DJ Tatana
Danny Tenaglia
Ten Walls
Third Party
Tilt
Tomcraft
Satoshi Tomiie
Trancesetters
Tiësto
Tritonal

U

Underworld

V
Armin van Buuren
Sander van Doorn
Vibrasphere
Vicetone

W
W&W (released as Manuputty)
Nick Warren (also released as Way Out West)
Jody Wisternoff (also released as Way Out West)
Michael Woods

Z
Sahar Z
Zedd
Mat Zo

See also
List of deep house music artists
List of house music artists
List of electro house artists
List of electronic music genres
List of electronic music festivals
List of electronic music record labels
List of club DJs
List of tropical house music artists

References

House music
Trance music
Progressive house artists
Progressive house